Byomkesh was a 2014 Indian Bengali crime fiction television series based on the Bengali sleuth Byomkesh Bakshi created by Sharadindu Bandyopadhyay. The series starred Gaurav Chakrabarty, Saugata Bandyopadhyay and Ridhima Ghosh as Byomkesh Bakshi, Ajit and Satyabati respectively. The series premiered on 20 November 2014 on Colors Bangla channel and ended on 14 November 2015. The first episode was narrated by Sabyasachi Chakrabarty.

Summary
Byomkesh Bakshi (Gaurav Chakrabarty) is a young Bengali private detective who solves spine-chilling cases with his chronicler and associate Ajit Bandyopadhyay (Saugata Bandyopadhyay).

Cast

Main 

 Gaurav Chakrabarty as Byomkesh Bakshi 
 Saugata Bandyopadhyay as Ajit Kumar Banerjee
 Ridhima Ghosh as Satyabati

Episodic appearance 
 Kaushik Bhattacharya as DSP Purandar Pandey
 Krishnendu Dewanji as Inspector Rakhal Sarkar
 Arjun Chakrabarty as Debashish Bhatta
 Amrita Chattopadhyay as Deepa Bhatta
 Paran Bandyopadhyay as Anukul Babu
 Dwijen Bandyopadhyay as Ashwini Babu
 Parthasarathi Deb as Ghanashyam Babu
 Vikram Chatterjee as Bilash Mallick
 Ena Saha as Shoiloja/Hina Mullick
 Prasun Gain as Prafulla Roy
 Arun Bannerjee as Sir Digindra Narayan
 Arindol Bagchi as Bidhu Babu, Train Ticket collector 
 Neel Mukherjee as Nandadulal Babu
 June Malia as Rebecca Lite
 Sourav Das as a freedom fighter
 Sourav Saha as Sukumar
 Loknath Dey as Makhanlal
 Debapratim Dasgupta as Motilal
 Biplab Dasgupta as Chintamoni Kundu
 Saptarshi Roy as Nilmoni Majumdar
 Anirban Guha as DSP of Munger, Shashanka Babu
 Chandan Sen as Dr. Debkumar Sarkar
 Sumanta Mukherjee as Dr. Rudra
 Subhasish Mukherjee as Boroda
 Anindya Banerjee as Shailendra Babu/Bhuban Das
 Phalguni Chatterjee as Kaligati Bhattacharya/Suropoti
 Tarun Chakraborty as Police Inspector
 Debranjan Nag as Mamdo
 Deepak Haldar as Ramanath Niyogi
 Rupa Bhattacharya as Pramila Pal/Shanta Sen/Tapan Sen/Medini
 Rajat Ganguly as Mahidar Choudhury
 Kanchana Moitra as Malati
 Ardhendu Bannerjee as Dr. Pannalal Palit
 Rajdeep Gupta as Inspector Ratikanta Chowdhury
 Basudeb Mukherjee as Deep Narayan Singh
 Amitava Das as Ramapoti/Bijoy Madhab Mukherjee
 Prantik Banerjee as Nitai
 Deepankar De as Ishan Chandra Majumder
 Tapas Paul as Sadhu/Ramkishore Babu
 Rudranil Ghosh as Bangshidhar
 Kaushik Sen as Manilal
 Kanchan Mullick as Murlidhar
 Sudipta Chakraborty as Haripriya
 Parno Mittra as Tulsi
 Kushal Chakraborty as Nishanath Sen
Sampurna Lahiri as Sunaina
 Bidipta Chakraborty as Mrs. Roy
 Joyjit Banerjee as Sharup Kumar/Rajkumar Basu
Shantilal Mukherjee as Santosh Samaddar
 Anindya Bose as Prabal Mallick
 Hritojeet Chottopadhyay as Kumar Tridibendra Narayan Rai Bahadur
 Aditi Chatterjee as Damayanti Sen
 Jayanta Dutta Burman as Kamal Krishna Das
 Badshah Maitra as Dr. Bhujangadhar Das
 Vivaan Ghosh as Satyakam Das
 Rohit Mukherjee as Ushapati Das
 Partha Pratim Dutta as Sunil Sarkar 
 Tribikram Ghosh as Ramani Mohan Babu 
 Sandip Dey as Nepal Gupta
 Indrajit Deb as Dr Sen
 Rana Mitra as Gangadhar(Benimadhab's Son in Law)
 Shreyasree Samanta as Laboni
 Saurav Palodhi as Amritya
 Rii Sen as Mohini Dutta
 Rajesh kr Chattopadhyay as Sanat
 Nibedita Chakraborty as Chameli(Santosh Samaddar's Wife)
 Ditipriya Roy as Chingri
 Tamal Roy Chowdhury as Uday Madhab Mukherjee(Deepa's and Bijoy's Grandfather)
 Sayak Chakraborty as Rathin
 Indrajit Mazumder as Phanish Chakraborty
 Ashok Mukherjee as Manish Chakraborty
 Sourav Chakraborty as Madhumoy Ghosh
 Judhajit Banerjee as Inspector Pramod Barat
 Kanyakumari Mukherjee / Soumili Biswas as Sulochana
 Samir Biswas as Pranhori Poddar 
 Rishav Basu as Bijoy Sen/Amar Pal
 Arindam Chatterjee as Himanshu Ray(Zamindar of Chorabali)/Pratul Gupta
 Soma Chakraborty 

 Dipanjan Bhattacharya Jack as Amaresh Raha 
 Arijit Chowdhury 
 Indrasish Roy
 Ratan Sarkhel as manager of old mess of Byomkesh and Ajit
 Ritoja Majumder 
 Anindita Sarker

Episodes
The episodes are listed as per they are aired.

Controversies
It has been reported that the shooting has been halted by a notification issued by the Artist Forum when they received several complaints against the production house Dag Creative Media. Complaints had been made by several artistes about non payment of dues for multiple months. The Federation of Cine Technicians and Workers of Eastern India has come out in support of the artists.

Awards
 Actor Gaurav Chakrabarty won a Tele Academy Award (Best actor in a leading role) in 2014 for his role as Byomkesh Bakshi.

See also
 Sharadindu Bandyopadhyay
 Byomkesh Bakshi
 Byomkesh Bakshi in other media
 Byomkesh Bakshi (1993 TV series), a Hindi language TV series based on the same character.
 Chiriyakhana
 Shajarur Kanta
 Uttam Kumar
 Rajit Kapur
 Gaurav Chakrabarty

Notes

References

External links
 
  
 Byomkesh at Voot

Bengali-language television programming in India
Indian crime television series
Byomkesh Bakshi
2014 Indian television series debuts
2015 Indian television series endings
Television shows based on Indian novels
Television shows set in Kolkata
Indian mystery television series
Detective television series
Colors Bangla original programming
Films based on works by Saradindu Bandopadhyay